Río Verde is a Chilean commune and settlement in Magallanes Province and Region. The commune is located in the area surrounding Seno Skyring, a sea inlet north of Riesco Island.

Demographics
The population grew by 6.9% (23 persons) between the 1992 and 2002 censuses.

Administration

As a commune, Río Verde is a third-level administrative division of Chile administered by a municipal council, headed by an alcalde who is directly elected every four years. The 2012-2016 alcaldesa is Tatiana Vásquez Barrientos (UDI).

Within the electoral divisions of Chile, Río Verde is represented in the Chamber of Deputies by Juan Morano (PDC) and Gabriel Boric (Ind.) as part of the 60th electoral district, which includes the entire Magallanes y la Antártica Chilena Region. The commune is represented in the Senate by Carlos Bianchi Chelech (Ind.) and Carolina Goic (PDC) as part of the 19th senatorial constituency (Magallanes y la Antártica Chilena Region).

References

External links
  Municipality of Río Verde

Communes of Chile
Populated places in Magallanes Province